The Lebanon women's national basketball team is the nationally controlled basketball team, administered by Lebanese Basketball Federation, that represents Lebanon in international women's basketball tournaments.

History

Gold Medals at Pan-Arab games and Arab Championships

At the 2003 Arab Women's Basketball Championship, Lebanon women's team crowded champion in that tournament. The following year, the team won the 2004 Pan Arab Games basketball competition which was held in Algeria, their third title was achieved in 2011 Pan-Arab Games in Qatar.

Promotion to division A of FIBA Asia and the FIBA ban

Lebanon women's team have been promoted to the division A of FIBA Women's Asia Cup after finishing 2nd in division B of 2009 FIBA Asia Championship for Women. The team played in the division A of 2011 FIBA Asia Championship for Women where they finished 5th in that tournament. In 2013, FIBA suspended the Lebanese Basketball Federation for four years because of political bickering between two clubs. That ban prevented the women's team from participating in the division A of FIBA Women's Asia Cup in 2013 making the team to be demoted back to division B after the ban is lifted in 2014.

In over a decade, Lebanon women's team have been promoted back to division A after finishing 1st in the division B of 2021 FIBA Women's Asia Cup.

Tournament records

Asia Championship

Squad
Roster for the 2021 FIBA Women's Asia Cup.

 
 

 

Roster for the 2017 FIBA Women's Asia Cup.

See also
Sport in Lebanon
Lebanon women's national under-17 basketball team
Lebanon men's national basketball team
Lebanon men's national under-19 basketball team
Lebanon men's national under-17 basketball team

References

External links
Lebanese Basketball Federation website

Basketball in Lebanon
Women's national basketball teams
Basketball